The surfperches are a family of perciform fishes, the Embiotocidae. They are mainly found in northeast Pacific Ocean (as far south as Baja California), but  a few species (genera Ditrema and Neoditrema) are found in the northwest Pacific, and the tule perch is found in freshwater habitats in California, United States. The largest species in the family reaches .

They are viviparous fishes, in which the embryo is nourished directly by the mother, as well as the yolk. This gives the family its scientific name, from Greek embios meaning "persistent" and tokos meaning "birth". This means the mother fish gives live birth instead of laying eggs.

Timeline of genera

See also
 List of fish families

References
 

Labroidei
Ovalentaria
Viviparous fish
Taxa named by Louis Agassiz